The Campeonato Nacional was one of the two football tournaments that formed the Primera División season (along with the Metropolitano championship) since 1967. The Nacional championship was played annually until its last edition in 1985.

The Nacional took place in the second half of the year while the Metropolitano took place in the first half of the year.

History
The Nacional championship was created by an initiative of then president of Argentine Football Association, Valentín Suárez, with the purpose of adding clubs outside Buenos Aires that competed in regional leagues. Teams best placed in "Torneo Regional" (created in 1967 as well) were eligible to play the Campeonato Nacional.

The first edition comprised 12 teams from the Metropolitano and four regional qualifiers, and was won by Independiente.

The Nacional was played with a number of different formats including the basic league table, two groups qualifying to semi-finals and four groups qualifying to a final group, round of 16 or quarter finals. The last Nacional in 1985 featured an extremely complicated set-up. The number of participants varied between a low of 16 (1967 and 1968) and a high of 36 (1974).

After the restructuring in the Argentine football league system in 1985 that created the Primera B Nacional, the Nacional and Metropolitano championship were abolished, being replaced by a unique competition with a European style format. The first edition was held in 1985–86.

List of Champions
Source:

Notes

Titles by club

See also
 Argentine Primera División
 Metropolitano championship
 Apertura and Clausura

References

Argentine Primera División
Defunct football leagues in Argentina

ru:Метрополитано и Насьональ